Ladrones may refer to:

Films
 Night Owls (1930 film), a 1930 Laurel and Hardy film, Spanish-language version Ladrones
 Ladrones (2015 film), a comedy directed by Joe Menendez

Islands
 Islas de los Ladrones, the old name for a series of islands under U.S. jurisdiction in the Pacific Ocean, now known as the Mariana Islands
 Ladrones Islands, part of the Wanshan Archipelago, in Guangdong Province, China
 Pirates of the South China Coast, referred to as Ladrones
 Los Ladrones, islands in the Gulf of Chiriquí, Panama

See also
 , Spanish-language name of the 2006 film Thieves and Liars
 Ladrón, a name
 Ladrones Islands (disambiguation)